Tali Lennox Fruchtmann (born 9 February 1993), known professionally as Tali Lennox, is a British model, artist, and actress, who used to work for Topshop and Burberry. As of 2014 she reduced her modelling focus and became a portrait painter. She is the daughter of Scottish singer Annie Lennox and Israeli record producer Uri Fruchtmann, and sister of Lola Lennox.

Career
In spring 2011 she appeared in various fashion houses, including Acne Studios, Christopher Kane, Prada and Miu Miu. In September 2012, she moved to New York City, where she took acting classes in the winter of 2013 with Susan Batson as her teacher.

Personal life
Lennox's longtime boyfriend was American artist and model Ian Jones. On 8 August 2015, Lennox and Jones were kayaking on the Hudson River in the US when their dual kayak capsized. Lennox was rescued by strangers on a passing boat, but Jones could not be found. After a two-day search, Jones' body was found. His cause of death was found to be accidental and "consistent with drowning." Jones's funeral was held on 17 August in his home state of Pennsylvania and attended by Tali, her mother Annie and her sister Lola.

References

English female models
English people of Israeli descent
English people of Scottish descent
Living people
1993 births
Models from London
British portrait painters